The 1812 Connecticut gubernatorial election took place on April 13, 1812.

Incumbent Federalist Governor Roger Griswold won re-election, defeating Democratic-Republican nominee Elijah Boardman with 83.99% of the vote.

General election

Candidates
Elijah Boardman, Democratic-Republican, former member of the Connecticut House of Representatives
Roger Griswold, Federalist, incumbent Governor

Results

Notes

References

Gubernatorial
Connecticut
1812